The 1947–48 Princeton Tigers men's ice hockey season was the 46th season of play for the program but first under the oversight of the NCAA. The Tigers represented Princeton University and were coached by Richard Vaughan in his 11th season.

Season
After a terrible end to the previous season, the Tigers were looking to get a good jump on the year. The first game against Brown, who were returning to the ice after a 9-year layoff, was a relatively soft landing for the Tigers who won the game as much on their depth as anything else. After inserting Robert O'Conner into the starting role for team captain Charlie Callanan, coach Vaughan got the Tigers to perform much better in their second game.

Over the winter break, Princeton travelled up to Buffalo to participate in a 4-team winter carnival. With Callanan back in goal, the Tigers won the first two games with solid performances on both sides of the puck. This left them with an impeccable 5–0 record as they entered the showdown with the defending eastern champions, Dartmouth. With a potential NCAA tournament berth up for grabs, the Tigers wanted to at least give the Indians a fight, however, the Greens demonstrated why they were one of the best teams in the country by taking complete control of the game. While Princeton didn't look out of place on the same ice as Dartmouth, the Hanoverians were obviously the better of the two.

On their way back to campus, the team made a pitstop in Canton to take on St. Lawrence. Unfortunately, the team got into penalty trouble in the first and surrendered 2 power play goals which the Larries rode to a 3–6 win. The Tigers hoped that they could flip the script a week later when they met Dartmouth for a rematch but the second edition was eerily similar to the first. Despite a strong defensive performance by O'Conner and Schmon, the Indians potted 6 goals in Princeton's first league game since 1942. The team collected itself and ended their losing streak with an overtime win over Clarkson thanks to a goal from Walt Elsaesser.

After righting the ship, Princeton played just one game over the next two and a half weeks. They met the US Olympic Team in that aggregation's first game together. The Tigers took advantage of the lack of familiarity by scoring 5 goals in the first and riding that to an easy 6–2 victory.

Princeton didn't play another game until the end of the month and, when they did, had lost both Bob Schmon and Paul Van Dyke to academic ineligibility. The team looked completely out of sorts in the match against Boston University and produced their worst performance all season, losing 1–8. Without those two lynchpins in the lineup, the Tigers lost the other two games before the start of the Spring semester, dropping their record to 7–6.

Refusing to bow to the difficulties, the Tigers fought back in the next game and upset tournament-hopeful Boston College. Princeton continued its inspired play and won matches against both Harvard and Yale. With Bill Clarkson taking over from Van Dyke as the team's #1 center, both he and Freddie Roberts recorded hat-tricks to give the Tigers a pair of conference wins.

The three wins gave Princeton an outside chance at the NCAA tournament but they would have to continue the strong play over the remaining five game. Unfortunately, the entire offense fell apart down the stretch. In the final 5 contests, Princeton scored just 9 goals and lost every game. The Tigers had been 2nd in the Pentagonal League at the time but ended up tied for last with Yale and had yet another disappointing finish to their season.

Roster

Standings

Schedule and Results

|-
!colspan=12 style=";" | Regular Season

References

Princeton Tigers men's ice hockey seasons
Princeton
Princeton
Princeton